Gabriel Arias Arroyo (born 13 September 1987) is an Argentine-born Chilean footballer who plays as a goalkeeper for Argentine Primera División club Racing Club and the Chile national team.

International career
Arias qualifies to play for Chile through his maternal grandparents. In 2018, he was called-up for the first time. He made his debut on 4 June 2018, in a friendly match against Serbia, where he played the whole match and kept a clean sheet on a 1–0 victory.

Being one of the key players for Racing to win the 2018–19 Argentine league, Arias was asked by media if he would play for the Argentina national team, considering that he had played for Chile in friendly matches only. However, he maintained his position of representing Chile internationally.

Honours and achievements
Racing
Argentine Primera División: 2018–19

References

External links

Gabriel Arias salary & contract at salarysport.com

1987 births
Living people
Association football goalkeepers
Chilean footballers
Chile international footballers
Chilean people of Argentine descent
Sportspeople of Argentine descent
Chilean Primera División players
Unión La Calera footballers
Argentine footballers
People from Neuquén
Argentine sportspeople of Chilean descent
Primera Nacional players
Olimpo footballers
Argentine Primera División players
Defensa y Justicia footballers
Racing Club de Avellaneda footballers
2019 Copa América players
2021 Copa América players
Citizens of Chile through descent